Garner Township is a township in Pottawattamie County, Iowa, USA.

History
Garner Township is named for William Garner, a pioneer settler.

References

Townships in Pottawattamie County, Iowa
Townships in Iowa